Urahara is an anime television series based on the webcomic PARK Harajuku: Crisis Team!, which is written by Patrick Macias and illustrated by Mugi Tanaka. The anime adaptation was co-produced by EMT Squared and Shirogumi and aired from October to December 2017.

Synopsis
Three high school girls hailing from Harajuku band together to fight off culture thieving aliens from outer space.

Cast

Anime
Production of the anime adaptation was announced in March 2017. Amika Kubo directed the series at EMT Squared and Shirogumi. The production staff consists of Masatsugu Arakawa as the chief director, Natsuko Takahashi is in charge of series composition, Mariko Fujita as the animation character designer, and Takahiro Yamada as the mechanical designer. It aired from October 4 to December 20, 2017. Crunchyroll streamed the series. Funimation premiered the dub on October 24, 2017.

Episode list

Notes

References

External links
 

2017 anime television series debuts
American webcomics
Anime and manga inspired webcomics
Crunchyroll anime
EMT Squared
Funimation
Original English-language manga
Science fiction anime and manga
Shirogumi